Jennifer Guglielmo is a writer, historian and associate professor at Smith College, specializing in the histories of labor, race, women, im/migration, transnational cultures and activisms, and revolutionary social movements in the modern United States. She has published on a range of topics, including working-class feminisms, anarchism, whiteness and the Italian diaspora.

Guglielmo is the author of the award-winning book Living the Revolution: Italian Women's Resistance and Radicalism in New York City, 1880–1945 (2010) and co-editor (with Salvatore Salerno) of Are Italians White? How Race Is Made in America (2003). The book was translated into Italian in 2006: Gli Italiani Sono Bianchi? Come l' America ha costruito la razza.. She is currently translating short essays written in Italian by immigrant women anarchists—such as Maria Roda and Virgilia D'Andrea—in early twentieth-century New York City and northeastern New Jersey. These will be reprinted in her next book, My Rebellious Heart: Immigrant Women's Anarchist Feminist Prose in New York City's Radical Subculture, 1890–1930.

Guglielmo is also currently engaged in a grant-funded, collaborative, community-based public history/digital humanities project with the National Domestic Workers Alliance. Together they are developing tools for domestic workers and organizers to access historical knowledge and archival evidence and use history as an organizing tool.

Life and family
Guglielmo was born in Flushing, New York. Her brother Thomas A. Guglielmo is also a historian and works on Italian-American histories.

Education and career
Guglielmo received a Bachelor of Arts in history and women's studies from University of Wisconsin-Madison in 1990, a Masters of Arts in history from University of New Mexico in 1995 and a PhD in history from University of Minnesota in 2003. Her doctoral dissertation, "Negotiating Gender, Race and Coalition: Italian Women and Working-Class Politics in New York City, 1880 to 1945", won the Best Dissertation Award from the University of Minnesota and the Organization of American Historians’ Lerner-Scott Prize for best doctoral dissertation in U.S. women’s history.

She taught history and women's studies at William Paterson University, SUNY New Paltz, Ulster County Community College, and the University of Minnesota, before joining the faculty at Smith College in 2003.

Honors and awards
Smith College Sherrerd Prize for Distinguished Teaching, 2012.
Helen and Howard R. Marraro Book Award for Living the Revolution, 2011.
Theodore Saloutos Memorial Award for Best Book in U.S. Immigration History, Living the Revolution, 2010.
Honorable Mention from the Berkshire Conference of Women Historians for Best First Book, Living the Revolution, 2010.
Organization of American Historians Lerner-Scott Prize for the Best Doctoral Dissertation in U.S. Women's History, 2004.
University of Minnesota Best Dissertation Award for "Negotiating Gender, Race and Coalition: Italian Women and Working Politics in New York City, 1880 to 1945,” 2003.

Grants and fellowships
In 2018, Guglielmo and Michelle Joffroy (Smith College) received a private grant of over $2 million for a three-year public history/worker education project (2018-2021) with the National Domestic Workers Alliance. Guglielmo's work has also been funded by the Social Science Research Council and the American Association of University Women.

References

Year of birth missing (living people)
Living people
21st-century American historians
Social historians
University of Wisconsin–Madison College of Letters and Science alumni
University of New Mexico alumni
University of Minnesota College of Liberal Arts alumni
Smith College faculty
American women historians
21st-century American women writers